James William Roxburgh (5 July 1921 – 10 December 2007) was an Anglican bishop. He was the sixth Bishop of Barking (but first area bishop under the 1983 scheme) in the Church of England from 1983 to 1990.

Roxburgh was educated at Whitgift School in South Croydon and St Catharine's College, Cambridge. His first appointment in ordained ministry was as a curate in Folkestone. He then held incumbencies in Bootle, Drypool (Kingston upon Hull) and Barking. Before being ordained to the episcopate, he was the Archdeacon of Colchester. Following his retirement, he served as an Assistant Bishop in Liverpool.

References

1921 births
People educated at Whitgift School
Alumni of St Catharine's College, Cambridge
Archdeacons of Colchester
Bishops of Barking
2007 deaths